Highway 16 (or Ariel Sharon Blvd) is a highway at the western entrance to Jerusalem providing direct access to the southern and central sections of the city from the west. Most of the road is located inside newly built tunnels. The project cost approximately 1.5 billion shekels, and was inaugurated a year ahead of schedule on 31 August 2022.

Highway
The highway connects Highway 1 at the new Motza Interchange and Jerusalem's Highway 50 (Begin Boulevard) at Givat Mordechai Interchange.  The road travels mostly through a series of tunnels under the west Jerusalem neighborhoods of Har Nof and Yefeh Nof and the parking lots of Shaare Zedek Medical Center.  In the center, an above ground interchange was built in the valley of Nahal Revida (Revida Stream) adjacent to the Pi Glilot Fuel Terminal to connect to Derech Yosef Weitz leading to Givat Shaul.  The road was constructed as a four lane freeway with a speed limit of 80 km/h.

History
The road was first proposed in the 1990s. Originally, the road was supposed to skirt around the western and southern slopes of Har Nof before entering a tunnel at Nahal Revida continuing eastward under Yefeh Nof. This would have created nearly a kilometer of fully open road through the Jerusalem Forest. This plan was met with stiff opposition by the Jewish National Fund and a variety of "Green" groups due to ecological damage to the forest. As a result, the plan was changed to include a tunnel under Har Nof with an intermediate above-ground interchange at Nahal Revida.

The program was stopped in 2003 to conduct environmental studies and consider an alternative to the Nahal Revida Interchange. By the end of 2007, the National Infrastructure Committee decided to adopt the plan pending clarifications and public review. In 2010, the plan again moved forward with an indemnity agreement between the Jerusalem Municipality and the Israel Ministry of Transport. At the same time, responsibility for building the road was shifted from the Moriah Jerusalem Development Corporation to the National Roads Company of Israel. Economic and environmental studies were updated. A plan to build the road as one long tunnel with Nahal Ravida Interchange underground was rejected both for economic reasons and because of the need for massive ventilation facilities that would cause greater environmental damage to the forest.

The plan was approved in 2011, again with further delays pending public review. At the end of 2012, according to the National Roads Company, the plan has been approved and budgeted. After many delays, the contract for construction was finally awarded in August 2018, with construction expected to begin in 2019 and last through 2023.

Following the death of Talmudic scholar and former Sephardi Chief Rabbi of Israel Ovadia Yosef in 2013, Israeli Minister of Transport Yisrael Katz announced that the road would be named in his honor. However, the Jerusalem Municipality Names Committee, which has jurisdiction in the matter, declared in 2017 that the road would be named in honor of former Israeli Prime Minister, Ariel Sharon.

Construction Accident
On June 7, 2021, a portion of the Shaare Zedek hospital's external parking lot collapsed.  Seven parked cars fell into the sinkhole, which was deep enough to "swallow" a whole palm tree vertically, as well. There were no reported victims, either killed or wounded. A cave or space between the ground and excavated tunnel seems to be the cause of the sinkhole. Later, in August, Netivei Israel's spokesman said "We are exercising responsibility by repairing the hole", adding "responsibility is not guilt" because "there is also a separate issue regarding water from the Gihon water company that had permeated the ground due to insufficient drainage. It is also possible that we will never know the cause.".

Criticism 
Critics of the project note that because the road currently ends at a traffic light, it creates heavy congestion inside the city. To partially overcome this, a set of tunnels that will enable a more direct connection to Begin highway are expected to be completed in the late-2020s. Other criticism include the project's very large budget which could have been used to advance public transportation instead. Building of the project significantly disrupted the Motza and Revida valleys' natural habitat as well as large pre-historic archeological site which was discovered and subsequently reburied.

Interchanges (west to east)

References

External links
Road 16 Position and Elevation Diagrams PDF on National Roads Company of Israel website 
Road 16 Environmental impact statement PDF on National Roads Company of Israel website 
Plan documents  for National Infrastructure Plan 2 (Road 16)

16
16
16
Ariel Sharon
Tunnels in Israel
Transport in Jerusalem